{{Automatic taxobox
| name = Cryptobranchoidea
| taxon = Cryptobranchoidea
| image = Cryptobranchus alleganiensis.jpg
| image_caption = Cryptobranchus alleganiensis
| image2 = Hynobius fossigenus.png
| image2_caption = Hynobius fossigenus
| fossil_range = Middle Jurassic - Present
| authority = Dunn, 1922
| subdivision_ranks = Subgroups
| subdivision = *Chunerpeton?
Jeholotriton
Pangerpeton
Nesovtriton?
Iridotriton?
Kiyatriton?LaccotritonSinerpetonCryptobranchidae
Panhynobia Ji, Anderson & Gao, 2021LiaoxitritonLinglongtritonNeimengtritonRegalerpetonNuominerpetonHynobiidae
}}

The Cryptobranchoidea are a suborder of salamanders found in Asia, European Russia, and the United States. They are known as primitive salamanders, in contrast to Salamandroidea, the advanced salamanders. It has two living subdivisions, Cryptobranchidae, which includes Asian giant salamanders and hellbenders, and Hynobiidae, commonly known as Asian salamanders.

Some species of the fully aquatic family Cryptobranchidae are known as giant salamanders due to their large size.

The oldest members of the group are known from the Middle Jurassic (Bathonian) aged Yanliao Biota of China.

Taxonomy
This suborder contains only two families at present. All other members are extinct and are only known as fossils.Chunerpeton Haifanggou Formation, China, Middle Jurassic (Bathonian) (neotenic, has alternatively been recovered outside of Cryptobranchoidea)Jeholotriton Haifanggou Formation, China, Middle Jurassic (Bathonian) (neotenic)Pangerpeton Haifanggou Formation, China, Middle Jurassic (Bathonian)Nesovtriton Bissekty Formation, Uzbekistan, Late Cretaceous (Turonian)Iridotriton Morrison Formation, United States, Late Jurassic (Tithonian)Kiyatriton Itat Formation, Russia, Middle Jurassic (Bathonian) Ilek Formation, Russia, Early Cretaceous (Barremian-Aptian) (Presumed to be a cryptobranchoid)Laccotriton Fengshan fossil bed, China, Late Jurassic (Tithonian)Sinerpeton Fengshan fossil bed, China, Late Jurassic (Tithonian)
Cryptobranchidae (Late Cretaceous-Recent)
Panhynobia
 Liaoxitriton Jiufotang Formation, China, Early Cretaceous (Aptian)
 Linglongtriton Tiaojishan Formation, China, Late Jurassic (Oxfordian)
 Neimengtriton Haifanggou Formation, China, Middle Jurassic (Bathonian)
 Regalerpeton Dabeigou Formation, China, Early Cretaceous (Hauterivian)
 Nuominerpeton'' Longjiang Formation, China, Early Cretaceous (Aptian)
 Hynobiidae (Miocene-Recent)

References 

 
Salamanders
Oxfordian first appearances
Extant Late Jurassic first appearances
Amphibian suborders
Taxa named by Emmett Reid Dunn